A beer hall is a large pub that specializes in beer.

Germany

Beer halls are a traditional part of Bavarian culture, and feature prominently in Oktoberfest. Bosch notes that the beer halls of Oktoberfest, known in German as Festzelte, are more properly termed "beer tents", as they are large, temporary structures built in the open air. In Munich alone, the Festzelte of Oktoberfest can accommodate over 100,000 people.

Bavaria's capital Munich is the city most associated with beer halls; almost every brewery in Munich operates a beer hall. The largest beer hall was the 5,000-seat Mathäser near the München Hauptbahnhof (Munich central train station), which has since been converted into a movie theater.

The Bürgerbräukeller, located in Munich, was a particularly prominent beer hall in Bavaria that lent its name to the 1923 Beer Hall Putsch, an attempted Nazi coup led by Adolf Hitler. The Bürgerbräukeller had long been a Nazi meeting place, and was the starting point of the 1923 coup.

United States
American beer halls became popular in the mid-19th century, following a wave of immigration from Germany to the United States. They became an alternative to the American-style tavern.

St. Louis, Missouri is home to a number of beer halls, some of which seat several hundred persons. Hofbräuhaus has eight franchised beer halls in the United States.

The Loerzel Beer Hall was built around 1873 in Saugerties, Ulster County, New York, and was added to the U.S. National Register of Historic Places in 2000. It is currently an apartment building.

German brewers who immigrated to Milwaukee, Wisconsin built "hundreds of distinctive taverns and beer halls", and also built and established large outdoor beer gardens.

See also
 Beer Hall Boycott – a female-led national campaign in South Africa of boycotting municipal beer halls 
 Brewpub
 Hofbräuhaus
 List of public house topics
 Rathskeller

Notes

References

External links

Types of drinking establishment
German beer culture